Robert Bruce Findler, colloquially known as "Robby", is an American computer scientist, currently, a professor of computer science at Northwestern University. He is also a member of the PLT group and, as such, responsible for the creation and maintenance of DrRacket. In addition to DrRacket, Findler has contributed numerous components to Racket and supervises its Web-based software library, called PLaneT. Findler is also a leading team member of the ProgramByDesign project.

Findler received his PhD at Rice University under the direction of Matthias Felleisen. His dissertation was on the linguistics of software contracts, popularly known as design by contract. His work on software contracts provides a more careful accounting of blame, thereby helping programmers quickly home in on the faulty part of a software system.

In addition to DrRacket and software contracts, Findler focuses on the design and implementation of a workbench for semantics engineers. This workbench, called Redex, is a tool for specifying and executing the reduction semantics of a programming language. It is used by programming language researchers in the US and Europe. Most recently, SUN's Fortress research team used Redex to specify and explore key parts of their language.

Findler served as the semantics editor of the Revised^6 Report on the Scheme programming language. He and his PhD student Jacob Matthews developed a Redex model of the core semantics, which is included as an appendix of the report.  The appendix plays the same role as Standard ML's formal specification (Milner, Tofte, Harper, MacQueen) but is executable and thus can visualize individual examples.

Awards

In 2018, he and others were awarded the SIGPLAN Programming Languages Software Award for their work on Racket

In 2012, he and Matthias Felleisen were awarded the Most Influential ICFP Paper Award for their work on contracts

References

External links
Home page at the Northwestern University
Google scholar profile

Programming language researchers
Living people
Rice University alumni
Northwestern University faculty
Year of birth missing (living people)